Helen Curry (October 22, 1896 – November 15, 1931) was an American stage actress.

Biography

Early life and family

Helen Curry was born October 22, 1896, in Chester, Pennsylvania to Thomas A. Curry and Sarah Jeffries both of whom were playwrights. Curry had one brother, pulp fiction writer Tom Curry (1900-1976).  In 1916, Curry married author F. R. Buckley.

The American Academy of Dramatic Arts
Curry studied at The American Academy of Dramatic Arts (AADA) which at the time was housed in the Lyceum Theatre.  Her father, in addition to being a playwright, was the personal secretary to theatrical impresario David Belasco from 1914 until Belasco's death in 1931 and subsequently held the same position for Morris Gest. David Belasco was an important early supporter of the AADA.  He taught acting there and also acted as stage manager (in today's terms, director or artistic director) for several productions at the Lyceum Theatre.

Career

She appeared in amateur theatricals with her parents as a child.

In 1913 at the age of 17 Curry had her first professional role touring with Doris Keane in Edward Sheldon's play Romance.

Curry played Miss Carpenter in Good Night, Nurse! , later renamed Sick-A-Bed, by Ethel Watts Mumford at the Tremont Theatre in Boston.

She also appeared in Cleves Kinkead's Common Clay with Jane Cowl.

She played the title character in Mary Broome at the Neighborhood Playhouse, part of the early 20th century Little Theatre Movement, similar to the Off-Broadway movement of the 1950s. O. W. Firkins of The Weekly Review said of her "Miss Helen Curry as Mary Broome was perfect".

In 1920 Curry appeared on Broadway with silent film star Theda Bara in The Blue Flame, a four-act play written by George V. Hobart and John Willard.

Death

Curry died November 15, 1931 at the age of 35 at her home in Norwalk, Connecticut an apparent suicide. She was interred in Cedar Hill Cemetery, Hartford, Connecticut.

State register
Curry's former home in Norwalk, CT is listed on the Connecticut State Register of Historic Places.

References

External links
 
 Helen Curry at AboutTheArtist

1896 births
1931 deaths
20th-century American actresses
Actors from Norwalk, Connecticut
Actresses from Connecticut
American Academy of Dramatic Arts alumni
American stage actresses
Burials at Cedar Hill Cemetery (Hartford, Connecticut)
People from Chester, Pennsylvania
People from Norwalk, Connecticut
Suicides by firearm in Connecticut
1931 suicides